Anton Dimitrov (born 31 October 1979, in Dobrich) is a Bulgarian footballer who plays as a defender.

External links 
 

1979 births
Living people
Bulgarian footballers
PFC Dobrudzha Dobrich players
FC Maritsa Plovdiv players
PFC Kaliakra Kavarna players
PFC Svetkavitsa players
Neftochimic Burgas players
First Professional Football League (Bulgaria) players
Association football defenders
People from Dobrich